Eva Urevc (born 2 November 1995) is a Slovenian cross-country skier.

She participated at the team sprint event at the FIS Nordic World Ski Championships 2021.

Cross-country skiing results
All results are sourced from the International Ski Federation (FIS).

Olympic Games

World Championships
1 medal – (1 bronze)

World Cup

Season standings

Team podiums
 1 victory – (1 ) 
 3 podiums – (3 )

References

External links

Living people
1995 births
Slovenian female cross-country skiers
Slovenian female biathletes
Sportspeople from Jesenice, Jesenice
Biathletes at the 2012 Winter Youth Olympics
FIS Nordic World Ski Championships medalists in cross-country skiing
Cross-country skiers at the 2022 Winter Olympics
Olympic cross-country skiers of Slovenia